Samford, as a person, may refer to:

John A. Samford (1905-1968), a United States Air Force general
William J. Samford (1844-1901), an American politician from Alabama

Samford, as a place, may refer to:
Samford, Suffolk, a community in Suffolk, England
Samford, Queensland, a town in South East Queensland, Australia
Samford Village, a locality in South East Queensland, Australia
Samford Valley, a locality in South East Queensland, Australia
Samford University, a private university in Homewood, Alabama, United States
Samford Stadium-Hitchcock Field at Plainsman Park, a college baseball venue for the Auburn University Tigers
Duck Samford Stadium, a football and soccer venue for the Auburn High School Tigers